Leif Bernhard Nielsen (born 28 May 1942) is a Danish former football goalkeeper, who was named the 1966 Danish Player of the Year. He played 28 games for the Denmark national football team, and participated in the 1964 European Championship. He played for BK Frem in Denmark.  In 1968, he played for the Houston Stars of the North American Soccer League before finishing his career with Scottish club Greenock Morton.

Honours
 Danish Player of the Year: 1966

References

External links
Danish national team profile
 Boldklubben Frem profile
Houston Stars stats

1942 births
Living people
Footballers from Copenhagen
Danish men's footballers
Denmark under-21 international footballers
Denmark international footballers
Boldklubben Frem players
Greenock Morton F.C. players
Houston Stars players
1964 European Nations' Cup players
Scottish Football League players
North American Soccer League (1968–1984) players
Danish expatriate men's footballers
Expatriate footballers in Scotland
Expatriate soccer players in the United States
Association football goalkeepers
Danish expatriate sportspeople in Scotland
Danish expatriate sportspeople in the United States